Franz-Josef Vogt (born 30 October 1985) is a Liechtensteiner football coach and former player who serves as head coach of FC Balzers II.

Career
Vogt played club football for FC Buchs from 2013 to 2014, and formerly played for USV Eschen/Mauren, FC Balzers and FC Chur 97.

In the summer 2019, he was hired as head coach of FC Balzers II

References

External links

1985 births
Living people
Liechtenstein footballers
Liechtenstein international footballers
FC Chur 97 players
USV Eschen/Mauren players
FC Balzers players
Association football defenders